Chapoma is a rural locality (a Selo) in Tersky District of Murmansk Oblast, Russia. The village is located on the Kola Peninsula. It is 1 m above sea level.

References

Rural localities in Murmansk Oblast